The Union of Freethinkers of Finland is the largest secularist and freethought organisation in Finland. The organisation supports the rights of those Finns who hold no religious affiliation, and promotes a science-based, rational and critical world view and humanistic ethics.

The organisation was founded in 1937 under the name the Union of Civil Register Associations.

The Tampere section of the organisation created the Eroakirkosta.fi website in 2003, which offers an electronic service for resigning from Finland's state churches.

References

External links

Atheist organizations
Organizations established in 1937
Skeptic organisations in Finland
Secularist organizations
Freethought organizations